Jadar, also transliterated as Jidr or Jadir, is a village in Bani al-Harith District of Amanat al-Asimah Governorate, Yemen. It consists of two parts, Jidr al-A‘la and Jidr al-Asfal.

History 
According to the 10th-century writer al-Hamdani, it was one of the villages granted by Sayf ibn Dhi Yazan to the Bani Shihab, a tribe now generally living in the area to the south of Sanaa.

References 

Villages in Sanaa Governorate